Lineo Shoai (born 10 January 1979) is a Lesotho sprinter. She competed in the women's 200 metres at the 1996 Summer Olympics.

References

1979 births
Living people
Athletes (track and field) at the 1996 Summer Olympics
Athletes (track and field) at the 2000 Summer Olympics
Lesotho female sprinters
Olympic athletes of Lesotho
Athletes (track and field) at the 2002 Commonwealth Games
Commonwealth Games competitors for Lesotho
Place of birth missing (living people)
Olympic female sprinters